Red Clay is a 1927 American silent Western film directed by Ernst Laemmle and starring William Desmond, Marceline Day and Albert J. Smith.

Synopsis
Native American John Nisheto serves with the American Army in France during World War I where he saves the life of Jack Burr, the son of a senator. Back in the United States Jack, not realising it is the same man who saved him, objects to John's courting of his sister due to his ethnicity despite John's success as a scholar and athlete. Only too late does Jack come to realise the truth after John is mortally wounded.

Cast
 William Desmond as Chief John Nisheto
 Marceline Day as Agnes Burr
 Albert J. Smith as Jack Burr
 Byron Douglas as Sen. Burr
 Billy Sullivan as Bobb Lee
 Lola Todd as Betty Morgan
 Noble Johnson as Chief Bear Paw
 Felix Whitefeather as Indian chief
 Ynez Seabury as Minnie Bear Paw

References

Bibliography
 Connelly, Robert B. The Silents: Silent Feature Films, 1910-36, Volume 40, Issue 2. December Press, 1998.
 Munden, Kenneth White. The American Film Institute Catalog of Motion Pictures Produced in the United States, Part 1. University of California Press, 1997.

External links
 

1927 films
1927 Western (genre) films
1920s English-language films
American silent feature films
Silent American Western (genre) films
American black-and-white films
Universal Pictures films
Films directed by Ernst Laemmle
1920s American films